Nippulanti Manishi may refer to:
 Nippulanti Manishi (1974 film), an Indian Telugu-language action film
 Nippulanti Manishi (1986 film), an Indian Telugu-language action film